Europeade is the largest festival of European folk culture, held in a different European country each year. The last Europeade was held in Turku, Finland in 2017. The year before that it was held in Namur, Belgium in 2016.

The first Europeade was held in 1964 at the initiative of Mon de Clopper (1922–1998) from Flanders and Robert Müller-Kox, a German exiled from the Province of Silesia. Mon de Clopper was president of the Europeade until 1997, when he was succeeded by the current president Bruno Peeters (born 1939), also from Flanders.

The goal of the Europeade is to foster a united Europe, where everyone contributes and develops his or her own culture, respecting everyone else. This philosophy is practised each year during the five-day festival, when thousands of people from all parts of Europe, dressed in their traditional costumes, meet to sing, to make music, to dance and to celebrate - without formal lecturing.

In a typical Europeade there are about five thousand participants, all in costume, in almost two hundred groups, from about twenty-two countries. They all pay their own transport costs, and perform free of charge. Participants arrive during the Wednesday, and are accommodated in large premises wherever possible, typically in large schools, with basic beds supplied in the class-rooms, and using other school amenities. Large-scale catering is provided, usually  a simple breakfast, a packed lunch and a hot evening meal in one central location. Groups perform in a number of large concerts, in designated street locations, and take part in a massed parade through the town and in a major Saturday evening Europeade Ball. Outside the actual events many groups will sing, play and dance wherever they happen to find themselves, including the premises where they are lodged.  After the Sunday afternoon Closing Concert - typically ninety groups performing - groups are free to make their way home, but accommodation continues until after breakfast on the Monday morning.

Cities where the Europeade was held 
1964 Antwerp, Belgium
1965 Dortmund, Germany
1966 Antwerp, Belgium
1967 Valencia, Spain
1968 Antwerp, Belgium
1969 Marche-en-Famenne, Belgium
1970 Herzogenaurach, Germany
1971 Antwerp, Belgium
1972 Annecy, France
1973 Nuoro, Italy
1974 Antwerp, Belgium
1975 Marbella, Spain
1976 Annecy, France
1977 Nuoro, Italy
1978 Vienna, Austria
1979 Antwerp, Belgium
1980 Schwalmstadt, Germany
1981 Martigny, Switzerland
1982 Gijon, Spain
1983 Vienna, Austria
1984 Rennes, France
1985 Turin, Italy
1986 Figueira da Foz, Portugal
1987 Munich, Germany
1988 Antwerp, Belgium
1989 Libourne, France
1990 Valladolid, Spain
1991 Rennes, France
1992 Figueira da Foz, Portugal
1993 Horsens, Denmark
1994 Frankenberg, Germany
1995 Valencia, Spain
1996 Turin, Italy
1997 Martigny, Switzerland
1998 Rennes, France
1999 Bayreuth, Germany
2000 Horsens, Denmark
2001 Zamora, Spain
2002 Antwerp, Belgium
2003 Nuoro, Italy
2004 Riga, Latvia. A monument in Riga commemorates this Europeade. It was donated by cities that hosted the Europeade before, on the occasion of the first Europeade in the Baltic States and in a former Soviet republic. It took place from 21 July – 25 July, and it was the first biggest and most significant cultural event since the state of Latvia joined the European Union, thus becoming a landmark in the history of creating a common cultural environment. More than 4000 participants from 38 European countries and regions gathered in Riga for one of the largest European folk culture forums. 
2005 Quimper, France
2006 Zamora, Spain
2007 Horsens, Denmark
2008 Martigny, Switzerland
2009 Klaipėda Lithuania
2010 Bolzano, Italy
2011 Tartu, Estonia
2012 Padua, Italy
2013 Gotha, Germany
2014 Kielce, Poland
2015 Helsingborg, Sweden
2016 Namur, Belgium
2017 Turku, Finland
2018 Viseu, Portugal
2019 Frankenberg an der Eder, Germany

Participation by country 
For the Europeade 2008 in Martigny (Switzerland) some two hundred groups registered. Their countries of origin were as follows:
 27 groups from Germany
 26 groups from Spain and Belgium
 16 groups from Latvia
 15 groups from each Estonia, France and Italy
 10 groups from Hungary
 9 groups from Lithuania
 8 groups from the Czech Republic
 7 groups from Portugal
 5 groups from Denmark
 3 groups from each Ireland, The Netherlands, Romania and Sweden
 two groups from each Bulgaria, Cyprus, Finland, Greece and the United Kingdom
 one group from each Armenia, Austria, Georgia, Greenland and Luxembourg
 also the host country Switzerland was represented by only one group
 there were no groups from Iceland, Norway, Poland, Slovakia and Former Yugoslavia, despite the strong folk tradition of those countries.

For the Europeade 2011 in Tartu (Estonia) over hundred groups registered. Their countries of origin were as follows:
 34 groups from Estonia
 21 groups from Latvia
 13 groups from Finland
 12 groups from Germany
 8 groups from each Italy and Belgium
 5 groups from each Lithuania and Czech Republic
 3 groups from each Spain, Ireland, Portugal, Sweden and Turkey
 2 groups from each Slovakia, Cyprus and Denmark
 1 group from each Austria, Switzerland, France, Greenland, Hungary, Netherlands, Norway, Russia, Slovenia and United Kingdom
 there were no groups from Iceland, Belarus, Poland, Ukraine and Moldova, despite the strong folk tradition of those countries.

References

Sources 
 Europeade Website
 Europeade 2008 Martigny, Switzerland
 Europeade 2009 Klaipėda, Lithuania
 Europeade 2011 Tartu, Estonia
 Europeade 2015, Helsingborg, Sweden 

Music festivals established in 1964
European culture
Recurring events established in 1964
Folk festivals